The 1913 All-Ireland Senior Football Championship was the 27th staging of Ireland's premier Gaelic football knock-out competition. In the Leinster final Wexford ended Louth's day as All Ireland champions. Kerry were the winners.

Results

Connacht Senior Football Championship

Leinster Senior Football Championship

Note for 1 year London took part and hosted Louth.

Munster Senior Football Championship

Ulster Senior Football Championship

All-Ireland Senior Football Championship

Championship statistics

Miscellaneous

 All Ireland champions Louth hosted London in the Leinster championship.
 The Lookout effected some games in the championship.

References

All-Ireland Senior Football Championship